Khlong Pho is a watercourse in the provinces of Nakhon Sawan and Uthai Thani, Thailand. It is a tributary of the Sakae Krang River, part of the Chao Phraya River basin.

Pho